The five-colored munia (Lonchura quinticolor) is a common species of estrildid finch found in the Lesser Sunda Islands. It  inhabits many different habitats even in artificial landscapes, forest, shrubland and wet grassland habitats. The status of the species is evaluated as Least Concern.

Origin
Origin and phylogeny has been obtained by Antonio Arnaiz-Villena et al. Estrildinae may have originated in India and dispersed thereafter (towards Africa and Pacific Ocean habitats).

References

External links
 BirdLife Species Factsheet

five-colored munia
Birds of the Lesser Sunda Islands
five-colored munia
Taxa named by Louis Jean Pierre Vieillot